This is a list of ships built by John I. Thornycroft & Company at the yard at Woolston, England.  In 1966 the company merged with Vosper & Company. The combined company continued production at Woolston, and the ships produced after the merger are not included in this list.

Ships 
The list is sorted chronologically, with the yard number as secondary key. A large part of the information has been provided by the Miramar Ship Index (www.miramarshipindex.org.nz) through a Wikipedia partnership. However, the official lists of vessels built by Thornycroft (at both Chiswick and at Woolston) are available in the unpublished (but officially recognised) Thornycroft List of 1981 researched and compiled by the late David Lyon with assistance of Thornycroft personnel and the company's archives.

See also
List of ships built at John I. Thornycroft & Company, Chiswick

References 

 John I. Thornycroft
John I. Thornycroft, Woolston